Sheykh Khanlu (also Romanized as Sheykh Khānlū) is a village in Chenaran Rural District, in the Central District of Chenaran County, Razavi Khorasan Province, Iran. At the 2006 census, its population was 666, in 152 families.

References 

Populated places in Chenaran County